Androstoma is a genus of flowering plants belonging to the family Ericaceae.

Its native range is Tasmania and New Zealand.

Species:

Androstoma empetrifolium 
Androstoma verticillatum

References

Epacridoideae
Ericaceae genera